Caloptilia mabaella, the Hawaiian ebony leaf miner, is a moth of the family Gracillariidae. It was first described by Otto Herman Swezey in 1910. It is only known from the Hawaiian island of Oahu in the United States.

The larvae feed on Diospyros sandwicensis, Diospyros hillebrandii and Diospyros haplostylis. They mine the leaves of their host plant. The mine starts near the margin of the leaf and runs towards the base, approaching the margin, then it follows it to near the apex, further to the midrib which it follows downward, soon widening quite regularly to a broad blotch extending nearly to the base of the leaf.

The larva emerges from the mine to construct its cocoon, which is rounded oval, white and parchment like. It is about 7 mm long and is made on the surface of the leaf in a depression or a slight fold at the margin.

External links

mabaella
Endemic moths of Hawaii
Moths described in 1910